Charles Cargill Kettle (4 June 1850 – 17 December 1918) was a New Zealand cricketer, lawyer and judge. He played four first-class matches for Otago between 1868–69 and 1871–72. He was the first person born in New Zealand to be appointed a judge.

Kettle was born in Dunedin on 4 June 1850, the son of Charles Henry Kettle. He was educated at Nelson College from 1862 to 1863 and then at Otago Boys' High School. After leaving school, he was articled to Dunedin lawyer James Macassey in 1868, and admitted as a barrister and solicitor in 1873. He practised law in Dunedin until being appointed district judge for Wanganui and Taranaki, and resident magistrate for New Plymouth in 1890, becoming the first New Zealand-born judge. He transferred to Auckland in about 1901, and became stipendiary magistrate there when the district courts were abolished. He died in Auckland on 17 December 1918 at the age of 68, having retired from the bench a few months earlier.

Kettle played first-class cricket four times for Otago against Canterbury, once in each of the representative matches played in the years between 1868–69 and 1871–72. At the time these were the only first-class matches played in New Zealand. He scored a total of 67 runs, with a highest score of 28 not out made on his debut.

References

External links
 

1850 births
1918 deaths
New Zealand cricketers
Otago cricketers
Cricketers from Dunedin
People educated at Nelson College
People educated at Otago Boys' High School
New Zealand lawyers
New Zealand judges